Arasur is a revenue village in the Thiruvennainallur taluk of Viluppuram district, in the Indian state of Tamil Nadu, and the headquarters of Arasur revenue block.

Geography
Arasur is within Thiruvennainallur taluk, which is in the southwestern part of Viluppuram district.

Demographics
In 2011 Arasur had a population of 3,021 people living in 687 households. 1,547 (51.2%) of the inhabitants were male, while 1,474 (48.8%) were female.  368 children in the town, about 12.2% of the population, were at or below the age of 6. 63.0% of the population was literate, with the male rate of 71.8% being notably higher than the female rate of 53.9%. Scheduled Castes and Scheduled Tribes accounted for 46.8% and 0.03% of the population, respectively.

References

Villages in Viluppuram district